Paiwarin Khao-Ngam  (born on February 10, 1961, in Roi Et) is a Thai writer.

His first work, There's No Poem From A Poor Man, was published in 1979. In 1995 he won the S.E.A. Write Award for his collection of poems, Banana Tree Horse.

References

Paiwarin Khao-Ngam
1961 births
Living people
S.E.A. Write Award winners
Paiwarin Khao-Ngam
Paiwarin Khao-Ngam
Paiwarin Khao-Ngam
Paiwarin Khao-Ngam
Paiwarin Khao-Ngam
20th-century male writers